Dumitrașcu Cantacuzino (c. 1620 – 1686) was Prince of Moldavia 1673, 1674 to 1675, and 1684 to 1685.

Life 
Dumitrașcu Cantacuzène was the son of the Grand Treasurer (Marele Vistiernic) Michel Cantacuzène (in Romanian Mihai Cantacuzino) and the great-grandson of Michel Cantacuzène "Chaïtanoglou" (in Romanian Mihai Cantacuzino Șaitanoglu), executed in 1578.

In 1663 he betrayed his kinsman and benefactor Constantin Cantacuzene in favor of Grigore I Ghica. He is then named three times to the throne of Moldavia by the Turks:
 from November 1673 to February 1674, when he seized the throne at the head of an army of 20,000 Tatars who took advantage of it to ravage the country;
 in November 1675;
 from February 8, 1684 to June 25, 1685; in the following July he was definitively driven out of the country with the support of Erer Iacantacuzene, Prince of Wallachia, by his own general Constantin Cantemir, whom he had falsely denounced as a traitor to the Ottomans.

Dumitrașcu Cantacuzino fled to Constantinople where he lived until his death in 1686. He is, in Romanian and Moldavian history, the prototype of the "phanariote profiteur" who founded neither school nor hospice, only ruled 'for its exclusive benefit, acts unscrupulously and impoverishes the country.

From his union with a princess Ruxandra he left three children including:
 Cassandra, first wife of Nicolas Mavrocordato around 1700.

References

Sources 
 Alexandru Dimitrie Xenopol Histoire des Roumains de la Dacie trajane : Depuis les origines jusqu'à l'union des principautés. E Leroux Paris (1896)
 Nicolas Iorga Histoire des Roumains et de la romanité orientale. (1920)
  Constantin C. Giurescu & Dinu C. Giurescu, Istoria Românilor Volume III (depuis 1606), Editura Științifică și Enciclopedică, București, 1977.
 Mihail Dimitri Sturdza, Dictionnaire historique et généalogique des grandes familles de Grèce, d'Albanie et de Constantinople, M.-D. Sturdza, Paris, chez l'auteur, 1983 .
 Jean-Michel Cantacuzène, Mille ans dans les Balkans, Éditions Christian, Paris, 1992. 
 Gilles Veinstein, Les Ottomans et la mort (1996) .
 Joëlle Dalegre Grecs et Ottomans 1453-1923. De la chute de Constantinople à la fin de l'Empire Ottoman, L'Harmattan Paris (2002)  .
 Jean Nouzille La Moldavie, Histoire tragique d'une région européenne, Ed. Bieler (2004), .
 Traian Sandu, Histoire de la Roumanie, Perrin (2008).

Rulers of Moldavia
Cantacuzino family
1620s births
1685 deaths